Korean era names were titles adopted in historical Korea for the purpose of year identification and numbering. Era names were used during the period of Silla, Goguryeo, Balhae, Taebong, Goryeo, Joseon, and the Korean Empire. Various Korean regimes officially adopted the era names of Chinese dynasties.

Era names originated in 140 BCE in China, during the reign of the Emperor Wu of Han. Since the middle of the 6th century CE, various Korean regimes started to use era names.

List of Korean era names
This is a list of era names used by historical regimes on the Korean Peninsula. Several of these regimes officially adopted the era names of China; in such instances, the Chinese renditions of the era names are stated in parentheses.

Goguryeo

Silla

Other regimes contemporaneous with Silla

Balhae

Later Baekje

Taebong

Goryeo

Other regimes contemporaneous with Goryeo

Joseon

Korean Empire

Korea under Japanese rule
The Japanese renditions of the era names are stated in parentheses.

Modern era systems

Republic of Korea
Daehanminguk (대한민국, 大韓民國 "Great Korean Republic" : 1948)
Dangun-giwon (단군기원, 檀君紀元 "First Age of Lord Dangun" : 1948–1961)
Seoryeok-giwon (서력기원, 西曆紀元 "Age of Seoryeok", i.e. Age of the Western calendar, 1962-)

Democratic People's Republic of Korea

Juche (주체, 主體 : 1912-)

The North Korean government and associated organizations use a variation of the Gregorian calendar with a Juche year based on April 15, 1912 CE, the date of birth of Kim Il-sung, as year 1. There is no Juche year 0. The calendar was introduced in 1997. Months are unchanged from those in the standard Gregorian calendar. In many instances, the Juche year is given after the CE year, for example,    Juche . But in North Korean publications, the Juche year is usually placed before the corresponding CE year, as in Juche .

See also
 History of Korea
 List of monarchs of Korea
 Korean imperial titles
 Korean calendar
 Chinese era name

References

Bibliography
 https://web.archive.org/web/20070928031555/http://tiny.britannica.co.kr/bol/topic.asp?article_id=b15a3467a
 https://web.archive.org/web/20070928031307/http://tiny.britannica.co.kr/bol/view-table.asp?med_id=b15a346701t1.html
 https://web.archive.org/web/20070930193917/http://wondreams.hihome.com/temasogo_goguryeo2.htm
 http://100.empas.com/dicsearch/pentry.html?i=171244
 https://web.archive.org/web/20070930061902/http://www.ikgu.com/tt/717
A Guide to Korean Characters, 2nd Revised Edition, Bruce K. Grant, Hollym Publishing, Seoul, South Korea, 1982.
Sources of Korean Tradition, Volume One, Peter H. Lee, Yongho Choe, Hugh H.W. Kang (Eds), Columbia University Press, 1996 (Reign Name Translations, p. 21).

Calendar eras
Era name

de:Äraname#Äranamen in Korea